The Rumor V Cabinet was the 30th cabinet of the Italian Republic. It held office from 14 March 1974 to 23 November 1974, for a total of 254 days (8 months and 9 days).

Party breakdown
 Christian Democracy (DC): Prime minister, 15 ministers, 22 undersecretaries
 Italian Socialist Party (PSI): 6 ministers, 12 undersecretaries
 Italian Democratic Socialist Party (PSDI): 4 ministers, 8 undersecretaries

Composition

|}

References

Italian governments
1974 establishments in Italy
1974 disestablishments in Italy
Cabinets established in 1974
Cabinets disestablished in 1974